Histor–Sigma was a Belgian professional cycling team that existed from 1986 to 1991.

In media
In Japan, in the 1993-1994 TV series Gosei Sentai Dairanger, The auxiliary Kiba/White Ranger, a young 10 year old boy known as Kou sports a Histor Sigma cap. It is unknown if the character is even aware who the cycling team are or if he is even interested in cycling

References

External links

Cycling teams based in Belgium
Defunct cycling teams based in Belgium
1986 establishments in Belgium
1991 disestablishments in Belgium
Cycling teams established in 1986
Cycling teams disestablished in 1991